John J. McRae (October 10, 1864 – September 30, 1939) was a Canadian politician. He served in the Legislative Assembly of British Columbia from 1920 to 1924  from the electoral district of Yale, a member of the Conservative party. He also served as the Reeve of the District of Kent for 20 years.

References

1864 births
1939 deaths